Florian Krebs (born 4 February 1999) is a German professional footballer who plays as a midfielder for Finnish club Honka.

Career

Youth career 
Krebs played for BFC Alemannia 90 in his hometown Berlin and was subsequently admitted to the youth team of Bundesliga club Hertha BSC. In the 2017–18 season, Krebs became the captain of the under-19 team, playing in 24 matches and scoring 13 goals. After a victory over Schalke 04 II, he won the Under 19 Bundesliga with the team.

Hertha Berlin II 
Krebs scored 3 goals in 26 competitive matches in his first year of being professional with Hertha BSC II.

Chemnitzer FC 
From August 2019, Krebs suffered from an ankle injury until the end of the first half of the season and was then signed during the winter break by 3. Liga club Chemnitzer FC, with whom he signed a contract that was valid until the end of the season. He debuted in matchday 29 (3 June 2020) of the 2019–20 3. Liga season, in a 1–0 defeat against Sonnenhof Großaspach, coming on in the 71st minute for Tarsis Bonga. He appeared in the starting lineup in a 2–1 defeat at MSV Duisburg, playing for 52 minutes until being replaced by Bonga.

Borussia Dortmund II 
On 25 July 2020, Krebs joined Borussia Dortmund II.

Honka
On 17 January 2022, he moved to Honka in Finland.

Honours 
Hertha BSC U19
Under 19 Bundesliga: 2018

References

External links 
 
 
 

Living people
1999 births
German footballers
Footballers from Berlin
Association football midfielders
Hertha BSC players
Hertha BSC II players
Chemnitzer FC players
Borussia Dortmund II players
FC Honka players
3. Liga players
Regionalliga players
German expatriate footballers
German expatriate sportspeople in Finland
Expatriate footballers in Finland